Boris Godunov is a 1954 Soviet drama film directed by Vera Stroyeva, based on the 1874 opera of the same name by Modest Mussorgsky and the 1825 play by Alexander Pushkin, which tells the epic story of Tsar Boris Godunov, who reigned over Russia between 1598 and 1605. It was screened out of competition at the 1987 Cannes Film Festival.

Cast
 Alexander Pirogov as Boris Godunov
 Nikandr Khanayev as  Vasili Shuysky
 Georgii Nelepp as Grigori, the False Dmitri  
 Maxim Mikhailov as Pimen, a monk
 Ivan Kozlovsky as The Fool
 Aleksej Krivchenya as Varlaam  
 Venyamin Shevtsov as Misala, a monk
 A. Turchina as Innkeeper's wife
 Larisa Avdeyeva as Marina

References

External links

1954 drama films
1954 films
1950s historical musical films
1950s musical drama films
Soviet musical drama films
Soviet historical musical films
Soviet opera films
1950s Russian-language films
Films directed by Vera Stroyeva
Films based on operas
Films based on works by Aleksandr Pushkin
Films set in the 1590s
Films set in the 1600s
Cultural depictions of Boris Godunov